The 1963 Boston University Terriers football team was an American football team that represented Boston University as an independent during the 1963 NCAA University Division football season. In its seventh and final season under head coach Steve Sinko, the team compiled a 1–6–1 record and was outscored by a total of 162 to 43.

Schedule

References

Boston University
Boston University Terriers football seasons
Boston University Terriers football